During World War I, Imperial Germany was a military ally of the Ottoman Empire, which perpetrated the Armenian genocide. Many Germans present in eastern and southern Anatolia witnessed the genocide, but censorship and self-censorship hampered these reports, while German newspapers reported Turkish denial of the massacres. About 800 German officers and 25.000 German soldiers were an integral part of the Turkish army and belonged to its command and general staff. German officers signed orders that led to deportations of Armenians. Although individual Germans tried to publicize the Armenians' fate or save lives, the German state has been criticized for "extreme moral indifference" to the plight of Armenians and not doing anything to stop the genocide. In 2016, the Bundestag apologized for Germany's "inglorious role" in a resolution recognizing the genocide.

Information

The German Empire had been responsible for negotiating the Treaty of Berlin securing the status of Armenians in the Ottoman Empire. Germany under Chancellor Otto von Bismarck had been skeptical of German participation in the Middle East. This policy began to change under Kaiser Wilhelm II, who negotiated close relations with Ottoman Sultan Abdul Hamid II despite persecution of Armenians such as the Armenian massacres of 1894-1896. By the beginning of World War I an alliance had developed, and the Ottoman Empire under the Committee of Union and Progress entered the war on the side of Germany in the Central Powers. 

Beginning in April 1915, many Germans present in eastern and southern parts of Anatolia became witnesses to the genocide. German witnesses recognized the genocidal character of the deportations. On 2 June 1915, consul Max Erwin von Scheubner-Richter reported that "An evacuation of such a size is tantamount to a massacre because due to a lack of any kind of transportation, barely half of these people will reach their destination alive." Twenty days later, missionary Johannes Lepsius told the Foreign Office that the systematic deportations were

By 17 July, the German consul in Samsun reported:

According to historian Stefan Ihrig, "German archives hold a vast amount of such reports". Most of the German consuls in Anatolia prepared reports on the genocide and criticized it, but there was also an agreement with the Young Turk government "there was to be no written record of... conversations" on the Armenian issue. Rössler also complained that the German press printed false stories denying atrocities against Armenians.

Those trying to get the word out were confounded by Ottoman censorship. For example, Germans were threatened with imprisonment for taking photographs of the Armenian deportees who died during the death marches. Information about the genocide was also censored in Germany, but penalties were lenient and self-censorship had more of an effect. German newspapers printed denials of the atrocities and regurgitated the Ottoman position of seeing Armenians as a subversive element and their persecution as justified. According to Ihrig, all the information was available to a German audience "yet it did not want to see". Historian Margaret L. Anderson states, "If we look not at the hard-pressed German-in-the-street but at the elites, the close-knit world of movers, shakers, and public opinion-makers, then the answer is clear: everyone. And if we ask, what did they know? The answer, with equal certitude, is: enough."

Baghdad railway

The Baghdad railway was not located on the major routes of Armenian deportations or the main killing fields in the Syrian Desert. Nevertheless, it employed thousands of Armenians before 1915 and became drawn into the genocide. The first use of railways for genocide occurred in early 1915 when Armenian women and children from Zeitun were deported on trains to Konya and later marched into the Syrian Desert. Concentration camps were set up by railroad stations where tens of thousands of Armenians were held before deportation. According to the deputy director of the railway, Franz Günther, an average of 88 Armenians were packed into a single cattle car (usual capacity of 36 men) and newly born infants were taken from their mothers and thrown out of the train. The railway was paid for the deportation of Armenians, however, according to Günther's proposal, this money was spent buying food for them. 

In October 1915, a German officer—Lieutenant Colonel Böttich—countersigned the deportation of Armenians working for the railway. Böttich consistently hampered efforts by the railway to retain its employees and save Armenians, and the Imperial German Army supported him in his conflict with the railway. The Foreign Office then undertook an intensive but unsuccessful effort to destroy all copies of this order.

The railway hired as many Armenians as possible, including those unqualified for the jobs. In late 1915 and early 1916, the Ottoman government demanded the handing over of the Armenian workers as well as an estimated 40,000 to 50,000 widows and orphans who were in camps beside the railway. Although the railway company objected on the grounds that it would bring both construction and travel to a halt, some workers and their families, who until this time were staying in camps by the railway, were deported.

Some German employees tried to document the persecutions by taking photographs and collecting evidence, but an edict by Djemal Pasha required them to turn over all photographs and negatives. After this, photography was classified as espionage, but it continued nevertheless despite the risks. Franz  J. Günther, vice-president of the railway, secretly sent information to Berlin, where it was made available to the Foreign Office. German medic Armin Wegner, who worked on the railway, stated:

Culpability

Toleration of extreme violence against civilians was entrenched in military culture of Imperial Germany.  Other Germans, including naval attaché Hans Humann, openly approved of the genocide on nationalist grounds, rather than military necessity. 
After one group of Armenians was deported from Smyrna, German commander Otto Liman von Sanders blocked additional deportations by threatening to use military force to obstruct them.

German diplomats complained of an estimated 9.2 million marks in financial losses to German creditors as a result of the Armenian genocide, which could not be recouped as "abandoned" Armenian properties were confiscated by the Ottoman government. In 1916, Germany received 100 million marks of compensation from the Ottoman government; after the war, this sum was confiscated by the Allies. Although there were occasional German diplomatic protests against the genocide, Ihrig suggests that such protests "were mainly meant to save face and to control the political, reputational, and diplomatic damage the genocide might cause".

Ihrig suggests that the idea of German instigation may have been originally spread by the Young Turk government. Among German eyewitnesses, the most critical was the former interpreter Heinrich Vierbücher, who charged Germany with failing to break with the "Stambul assassins. [The German government] had joined the society of criminals, who had all the aces, and it had succumbed to their stronger will. Everything was subordinated to the pursuit of the phantom of victory". Armenian historian Vahakn Dadrian argued that German officials were "indirect accessories to crimes perpetuated by the [Turkish] Special Organization functionaries whose overall goal they endorsed, financed to some extent, and shepherded". According to historian Hilmar Kaiser, "German involvement in the Armenian Genocide covers a spectrum ranging from active resistance to complicity. A uniform German policy did not exist." 

According to historian Ulrich Trumpener, the German government had little influence over the Ottoman government, such that "direct protection of the Armenians was completely beyond Germany’s capacity". Trumpener further argues that Germany did not welcome or endorse the persecution of Armenians, although it should be faulted for "extreme moral indifference" to the Armenian plight and complete failure to take any measures to help them. Historian Margaret L. Anderson suggests that it would be unreasonable to expect Germany to end its alliance with the Ottoman Empire over the Armenian issue, as the Allies demanded, but that Germany could be faulted for lying to itself about the truth of Ottoman persecutions.  According to historian Hans-Lukas Kieser, the best opportunity to intervene would be late 1914, when the Germans could have reiterated and emphasized their commitment to the Armenian reforms. Failing that, "the German authorities could have bargained much better in the summer of 1915 in order to exclude certain groups and regions from removal", although Kieser does not think it possible for Germany to have stopped the genocide. Genocide scholar Donald Bloxham argued that "The idea of a German role in the formation of the genocidal policy . . . has no basis in the available documentation." Ronald Grigor Suny argues that "[t]he best word to describe the German role is complicity (Mitschuld in German) rather than initiation, participation, or responsibility... German  diplomats  and  officers  did  not  intervene  forcefully  to stop the Armenian deportations and massacres. They had the military power but not the political will to stop the massacres."

According to British human rights lawyer Geoffrey Robertson, if the Armenian genocide had been perpetrated a century later, the International Court of Justice would "hold Germany responsible for complicity with the genocide and persecution, since it had full knowledge of the massacres and deportations and decided not to use its power and influence over the Ottomans to stop them."

Sylvester Boettrich
Lieutenant Colonel Sylvester Boettrich, for example, signed at least one deportation order as head of the railroad department of the Ottoman General Headquarters that resulted in the dismissal and deportation of thousands of Armenians.

Eberhard Graf Wolffskeel von Reichenberg
Eberhard Graf Wolffskeel von Reichenberg was a German major and chief of staff of the deputy commander of the IV Ottoman Army, Fakhri Pasha. He was actively involved in the Armenian genocide, in which he destroyed a monastery in Zeitun (Süleymanlı) and the Armenian quarter of Urfa with German artillery in 1915. Von Reichenberg's shelling of Urfa led to the deportation and extermination of the city's Armenian population.

Otto von Feldmann
Otto von Feldmann was chief of operations department at the Ottoman General Headquarters from October 1915 and gave his advice to "clear certain areas [...] of Armenians at certain times." For Feldmann the deportations were necessary and he saw a military obligation to support them.

Friedrich Bronsart von Schellendorff
Friedrich Bronsart von Schellendorff, the German commander in the Ottoman Empire and, according to Ihrig, the second-most-powerful man in the country after Enver Pasha, complained about "whining German consuls who understood nothing about the military necessity for the resettlement" of Armenians. Some historians hold Bronsart von Schellendorf responsible for being the main architect of the deadly concept of deportations and for instigating the Armenian Genocide.

Colmar Freiherr von der Goltz
Colmar Freiherr von der Goltz was Commander in Chief of the Ottoman Army from October 1915 and was involved in the Armenian genocide alongside Sylvester Boettrich and other German officers. Freiherr von der Goltz developed the first plans for the deportation of Armenians. As early as October 1897, Goltz had suggested on an event of the German-Turkish Association (DTV) that half a million Armenians living on the Russian border be resettled in Mesopotamia. When Enver Pasha presented him with the deportation order in March 1915 Goltz agreed to it.

Aftermath

After the genocide, Germany attempted to portray its role in the best light. In 1919,  Lepsius published Germany and Armenia, a collection of German diplomatic communications on the genocide. However, he expunged German anti-Armenianism and information that reflected badly on Germany, leading the book to be described as apologetic. Lepsius stated that he had full access to the German archives and that no document had been altered, which was not accurate. However, the book also exposed the reality of the genocide to a wide audience.   

In 2015, President of Germany Joachim Gauck acknowledged Germany's "co-responsibility" for the genocide. In 2016, the Bundestag voted almost unanimously to recognize the genocide. The resolution also stated:

References

Sources

Further reading

German Empire in World War I
Armenian genocide
Germany–Ottoman Empire relations
Armenia–Germany relations
World War I crimes by Imperial Germany
Imperial German collusion with war crimes by the Ottoman Empire